Quabbin Regional High School is a secondary school in Barre, Massachusetts, United States, for students in grades 9–12. It serves the towns of Barre, Hardwick, Hubbardston, New Braintree, and Oakham. It also has a NJROTC program.

References

Educational institutions in the United States with year of establishment missing
Public high schools in Massachusetts
Schools in Worcester County, Massachusetts
Buildings and structures in Barre, Massachusetts